Galle Guardians cricket team is one of the five provincial cricket teams which make up the Sri Lankan domestic cricket structure representing mainly Galle District of Southern Province, Sri Lanka, and with some nearby provinces. In previous occasions, the province was included in to Southern Express and Ruhuna Reds, where part of them was combined in this season as Galle Guardians. The cricket team's first participation came during the Twenty20 competition known as the Inter-Provincial Twenty20 2016 season which was known as Super T20 Provincial Tournament.

The team plays their matches in Colombo R. Premadasa Stadium. Dinesh Chandimal is the captain of the side. Ajantha Mendis, Suraj Randiv, Dushmantha Chameera and Kithuruwan Vithanage are some of the other notable current Test cricketers and Limited overs cricketers in the national side.

Current squad
The squad for the 2015–16 season as of 26 January 2016.

||  || Dinesh Chandimal (c) ||  26 ||  Wicket-keeper batsman ||  RHB ||  
|-
||  || Amila Aponso ||  22 ||  Batsman ||  RHB ||  LO
|-
||  || Tilaksha Sumanasiri ||  21 ||  Batsman ||  RHB ||  ROS
|-
||  || Dushmantha Chameera ||  24 ||  Bolwer ||  RHB ||  RF
|-
||  || Dilhara Lokuhettige ||  35 ||  All-rounder ||  RHB ||  RMF
|-
||  || Hashan Dumindu ||  20 ||  Bowler ||  RHB ||  ROS
|-
||  || Udara Jayasundera ||  25 ||  All-rounder ||  LHB ||  LB
|-
||  || Prabath Jayasuriya ||  24 ||  All-rounder ||  RHB ||  LO
|-
||  || Suraj Randiv ||  30 ||  All-rounder ||  RHB ||  ROS
|-
||  || Shalika Karunanayake ||  28 ||  All-rounder ||  RHB ||  RMF
|-
||  || Ajantha Mendis ||  30 ||  Bowler ||  RHB ||  ROS
|-
||  || Lahiru Milantha ||  21 ||  Wicket-keeper ||  LHB ||  
|-
||  || Dilshan Munaweera ||  26 ||  Opening batsman ||  RHB ||  ROS
|-
||  || Primosh Perera ||  26 ||  Bastman ||  LHB ||  LB
|-
||  || Isuru Udana ||  27 ||  Bowler ||  RHB ||  RMF
|-
||  || Jeffrey Vandersay ||  25 ||  Bowler ||  RHB ||  LB
|-
||  || Kithuruwan Vithanage ||  24 ||  All-rounder ||  LHB ||  LB
|-
|}
|}

References

Provincial Twenty20 teams
Sport in Galle
Cricket clubs established in 2016
Sports clubs in Sri Lanka
Cricket in Galle